The American Association of Colleges of Nursing (AACN)  is a national organization of nurses in the United States that is dedicated to advancing nursing education. It was established in 1969, and represents nursing schools at 865 universities and colleges in the United States.

Newsletters and publications 

To view a list of AACN's Newsletters and Publications visit: www.aacnnursing.org/News-Information/Newsletters.

Board of Directors 
 Chair: Cynthia McCurren, University of Michigan-Flint
 Chair-Elect: Jean Giddens, Virginia Commonwealth University
 Treasurer: Lin Zhan, University of California-Los Angeles
 Secretary: Julie Sanford, DNS, RN, FAAN, University of Mississippi Medical Center

Members-at-Large:
 Stephen Cavanagh, PhD, MPA, RN, FACHE, FAAN, University of California-Davis
 Deborah J. Jones, University of Texas Medical Branch
 Jerry Mansfield, PhD, MS, RN, NEA-BC, Mount Carmel Health
 Susan Mullaney, UnitedHealth Group
 Victoria Niederhauser, University of Tennessee Knoxville
 Demetrius J. Porche, Louisiana State University Health Sciences Center
 Ora Strickland, PhD, RN, FAAN, Florida International University
 Christine Verni, Niagara University

President and Chief Executive Officer (ex officio): Deborah E. Trautman

Scholarship Opportunities 
The American Association of Colleges of Nursing offers a number of different scholarships to nursing students around the country for outstanding academic performance, students who aspire to leadership positions in academic nursing, and/or those who are committed to making a positive impact on the nation's health and health care. They have partnered with companies like  Liaison, Uniform Advantage, and Hurst Review to provide thousands of dollars in scholarships each year to students that apply and meet the requirements. Since the beginning of the Covid-19 pandemic, they have also started a scholarship program to help students that need financial support in order to complete their nursing programs and/or meet life expenses. Since the program was started in April 2020, they have disbursed a total of 158 awards.

References

External links 

Nursing organizations in the United States
School accreditors
Medical and health organizations based in Washington, D.C.
Healthcare accreditation organizations in the United States